Shu’aibu Ahmed Abbas (born 1 January 1992), known professionally as Lilin Baba, is a Nigerian singer, songwriter, record executive, film actor and entrepreneur. Lilin Baba is best known in Kannywood film industry for the role he played in his debut movie titled Hauwa Kulu. He was nominated at City People Entertainment Awards for 2018 Arewa Most Promising Music Act of the Year. He won the 2019 Arewa Best RnB Music Act of the Year at the City People Entertainment Awards.

Early career 
Lilin Baba used to sell ice blocks at ‘Bata,’ a local market in Fagge Local Government in Kano. After moving to Abuja with his brother, he set up his car and mortgage business.

Music artist 
After setting up his business, he met two producers, ‘Shadow’ and ‘Garkuwa.’ With their help, he released his debut song, " Arewa." He has released songs with Bala Usher and Mr. Cash. He has worked with Mr. Bangis,  Adam A. Zango, Don Adah,  Bash Em, Lilin Baba went to Lagos make songs with the biggest producers in the music industry
and he work with the biggest music producere Blaisebeatz (Obah) and he released a single music called (Rabin Raina)and others are on the way.

Discography  
 Rabin Raina Single (2022)produce by blaisebeatz (Obah)
 Tauraro EP 2022
 Sound from the north (2021) Album
 Arewa (2016)
 Dabbing (2019)
 Ba Zama (2019)
 Tsaya (2019)

Awards and nominations

Personal life
On June 18, 2022, the actor married a Kannywood actress known as Ummi Rahab.

References

1992 births
Nigerian male film actors
Living people
People from Maiduguri
Male actors in Hausa cinema
21st-century Nigerian male actors
Nigerian male television actors
Kannywood actors
Nigerian male singers
Nigerian businesspeople